Waiau Uwha River, previously known as the Waiau River, is a river in north Canterbury in the South Island of New Zealand. The Waiau Uwha River rises in the Spenser Mountains and flows eastward to the Pacific Ocean. The Waiau Uwha River has the second largest catchment——of North Canterbury's rivers.

In 2018, the name of the river was officially changed from Waiau River to Waiau Uwha River, to reflect its original Māori name, and to distinguish it from the longer Waiau River in the southern South Island.

References

External links
 

Hurunui District
Rivers of Canterbury, New Zealand
Rivers of New Zealand